Sir Miklós Perczel de Bonyhád (15 December 1812 in Bonyhád, Hungary – 4 March 1904 in Baja, Hungary), also known as Nicholas Perczel, was a Hungarian landholder, officer, and one of the leaders of the Hungarian Revolution of 1848. After his emigration to the United States of America he participated in the American Civil War as colonel of the 10th Iowa Infantry Regiment in the Union Army. He had a significant role in the liberation of Missouri. His older brother was Mór Perczel.

References

Further reading 
 Hermann Róbert: Az 1848–1849-es szabadságharc nagy csatái, Zrínyi Kiadó – 2004, 
 Magyarország hadtörténete két kötetben (főszerkesztő: Liptai Ervin), Zrínyi Katonai Kiadó – 1985,

External links 
 Perczel Miklós: Naplóm az emigrációból
 Perczel Miklós utca részlet Pécsett

1812 births
1904 deaths
19th-century Hungarian people
Hungarian soldiers
Hungarian Revolution of 1848
Hungarian knights
People from Bonyhád
Hungarian emigrants to the United States
Union Army colonels